The Amalekites, in the Book of Mormon, are first mentioned described as a group of dissenters from the Nephites (Book of Mormon index, Alma 43:13). They, along with the Lamanites and the  Amulonites are credited with building the city of Jerusalem, in the land of Jerusalem, within the land of Nephi (Alma 21:2).

The character of the Amalekites is described as "more hardened than the Lamanites" (Alma 21:3). In the various wars, the Amalekites are appointed captains because of their murderous dispositions (Alma 43:6).

Religiously, the Amalekites were followers of the order of Nehor (Alma 21:4). When Aaron, the son of Mosiah, enters their land, the Amalekites are among those who contend with him. Though they profess to believe in God, only one Amalekite is converted (Alma 23:14).

Because of them, the Lamanites are spurred on to kill their own people, the Anti-Nephi-Lehies (Alma 24:1). During the various wars between the Nephites and Lamanites, they are described as being better armed and continually inspire the Lamanites to fight (Alma 43:20, 44).

Origins
Unlike Amlicites and Amulonites, no origin appears to be directly stated for the Amalekites, but it is worth noting that according to the Words of Mormon 1:16, there arose "false prophets" and "false preachers," who were punished as the law allowed, and some of them joined the ranks of the Lamanites.

Additionally, some scholars, including Professor Royal Skousen, have proposed, based on textual evidence and on spelling variations in the original manuscripts, that "Amalekite" is an alternative spelling of "Amlicite." Thus, Skousen's research into the original manuscripts used as the source for printing the Book of Mormon suggests that the "Amalekites" and the "Amlicites" are not two separate groups but the same group. The original manuscripts provide evidence that this confusion arose due to human error in transcribing the Book of Mormon into English, as unfamiliar names were at times spelled inconsistently, as the contents of the Book of Mormon were verbally dictated to the scribes. That confusion, while not having doctrinal implications for the book's contents, still exists in the Book of Mormon  as of 2016.

See also
Amalickiahites
People of Morianton
Zoramites

References

Book of Alma, in the Book of Mormon, available online
Brief description of Amalekites on scriptures.churchofjesuschrist.org

External links
Excerpts on scriptures.churchofjesuschrist.org

Book of Mormon peoples